KNDA ("102.9 Da Bomb") is an urban contemporary radio station serving the Corpus Christi, Texas area. KNDA broadcasts at 102.9 MHz with an ERP of 50,000 watts, is licensed to serve the community of Alice, Texas, and is owned by Guerra Communications.  Its studios are in Corpus Christi and its transmitter is southwest of Robstown, Texas.

External links
 
 

NDA
Urban contemporary radio stations in the United States